Hydrobiomorpha is a genus of water scavenger beetles in the family Hydrophilidae. There are 56 extant described species in Hydrobiomorpha, along with several fossil species.

Species
These 56 extant species belong to the genus Hydrobiomorpha:
 Hydrobiomorpha acutidens Bachmann, 1988
 Hydrobiomorpha bovilli Blackburn, 1888
 Hydrobiomorpha brasiliensis Bachmann, 1988
 Hydrobiomorpha cambodiensis (Régimbart, 1903)
 Hydrobiomorpha caratinga Bachmann, 1988
 Hydrobiomorpha casta (Say, 1835)
 Hydrobiomorpha celata Mouchamps, 1959
 Hydrobiomorpha colombica Mouchamps, 1959
 Hydrobiomorpha corumbaensis Mouchamps, 1959
 Hydrobiomorpha costera Bachmann, 1988
 Hydrobiomorpha cultrifera (Régimbart, 1903)
 Hydrobiomorpha davidsoni (Hebauer, 2006)
 Hydrobiomorpha debbae Watts, 1990
 Hydrobiomorpha denticulata Bachmann, 1988
 Hydrobiomorpha deplanata Orchymont, 1911
 Hydrobiomorpha distincta (Hope, 1843)
 Hydrobiomorpha franca Bachmann, 1988
 Hydrobiomorpha grandis (Castelnau, 1840)
 Hydrobiomorpha helenae Blakburn, 1890
 Hydrobiomorpha ignorata  (Orchymont, 1928)
 Hydrobiomorpha iguazu Bachmann, 1988
 Hydrobiomorpha irina (Brullé, 1837)
 Hydrobiomorpha irinoides Bachmann, 1988
 Hydrobiomorpha isolata Mouchamps, 1959
 Hydrobiomorpha longa (Bruch, 1915)
 Hydrobiomorpha malaisica Mouchamps, 1959
 Hydrobiomorpha media (Brullé, 1837)
 Hydrobiomorpha microspina Watts, 1990
 Hydrobiomorpha mirabilis Mouchamps, 1959
 Hydrobiomorpha mucajai Bachmann, 1988
 Hydrobiomorpha naviga Short, 2004
 Hydrobiomorpha occidentalis (Balfour-Browne, 1939)
 Hydrobiomorpha paraensis Bachmann, 1988
 Hydrobiomorpha paulista Bachmann, 1988
 Hydrobiomorpha perissinottoi Bilton, 2016
 Hydrobiomorpha perssoni Hebauer, 2006
 Hydrobiomorpha phallica (Orchymont, 1928)
 Hydrobiomorpha polita (Castelnau, 1840)
 Hydrobiomorpha praesumptapolita Bachmann, 1988
 Hydrobiomorpha rudesculpta (Orchymont, 1939)
 Hydrobiomorpha rufiventris (Nietner, 1856)
 Hydrobiomorpha simplex Mouchamps, 1959
 Hydrobiomorpha solitaria Bachmann, 1988
 Hydrobiomorpha spatula Bachmann, 1988
 Hydrobiomorpha spiculosa Bachmann, 1988
 Hydrobiomorpha spinicollis (Eschscholtz, 1822)
 Hydrobiomorpha spinosa (Orchymont, 1928)
 Hydrobiomorpha straeleni (Balfour-Browne, 1950)
 Hydrobiomorpha tricornis Mouchamps, 1959
 Hydrobiomorpha trifasciata Mouchamps, 1959
 Hydrobiomorpha troxi Watts, 1990
 Hydrobiomorpha utiariti Bachmann, 1988
 Hydrobiomorpha utinga Bachmann, 1988
 Hydrobiomorpha venezolana Bachmann, 1969
 Hydrobiomorpha wencki (Paulino d'Oliveira, 1880)
 Hydrobiomorpha zetha (Balfour-Browne, 1950)

These extinct species are known only from fossils:
 †Hydrobiomorpha braunii (Heer, 1847)
 †Hydrobiomorpha enspelense Wedmann, 2000
 †Hydrobiomorpha eopalpalis Fikacek, Wedmann, & Schmied, 2010
 †Hydrobiomorpha fraterna (Von Heyden, 1859)
 †Hydrobiomorpha heeri Fikáček & Schmied, 2013

References

Hydrophilinae
Articles created by Qbugbot